Atlético Español was a football team which played between 1971 and 1982 in the Primera División de México. They played out of México City.

History 
Atlético Español Fútbol Club On September 19, 1971, when a group of Spanish entrepreneurs / business people decided to buy the franchise of what was then known as Necaxa and change their name to Atlético Español. The reason for the name change was due to their nationality and ideology in the world of business.  The  branded club were modeled on the defunct team Real Club España, with a similar name and kit to the predecessor. The team would immediately obtain the nickname Toros because in their badge was a bull next a football and the initials AE.

Español characterized itself to be a team which was a fighter, but their start was not the ideal one since in the 1971–72 season they were a point away from descending to the 2nd division. Other teams fighting to avoid relegation that season were Club de Fútbol Torreón, Irapuato FC and Club Veracruz, in the end Irapuato FC would be the team to be relegated. For the 1972–73 season Atlético Español would reach the semifinals against Club León losing 5–4 in the third leg going all the way to penalties..

In 1973–74 they would reach the final against a strong Cruz Azul. They would play a two legged tie in which Atlético Español would win the first leg 2–1 but lose the second 3–0, becoming the runner-up of the league.

In 1975 Atlético Español would win their first and only international title in the CONCACAF Champions' Cup 1975, they played the final against Transvaal of Suriname defeating them 5–1 in aggregate.

In 1976 they disputed the Copa Interamericana against Club Atlético Independiente of Argentina. Both games were played in Buenos Aires and after an aggregate score of 2–2 penalties needed to take place, Español losing the shootout to Independiente 4–2.

Season 1980–81 Español would once again get into the liguilla getting 4th in group A led by Cruz Azul, who would lose the final against Pumas de la UNAM. For the season of  1981–82 they would dispute their ultimate ligulla getting to the quarterfinals versus Club de Fútbol Atlante, round they would lose 5–3 in aggregate.

After 11 years as Atlético Español, the club owners unexpectedly sold the franchise, which was acquired by the Mexican television network Televisa. On July 21, 1982, the name and colours reverted to that of Necaxa, hoping to revive the tradition the team had left in Mexico City.

Statistics 
These are the statistics of Atlético Español in the Primera División de México:

In Copa México:

GP – Games Played
W – Win
D – Draw
L- Loss
GF – Goals in Favour
GC – Goles en Contra GA – Goals Against
Pts – Points
DIF –  Goal Difference

Honours

National 
Primera División Runner-up: 1
1973–74

International 
CONCACAF Champions' Cup: 1
1975

 Copa Interamericana
 Runners Up (1):1975

References

Defunct football clubs in Mexico City
Association football clubs established in 1971
Association football clubs disestablished in 1982
1971 establishments in Mexico
1982 disestablishments in Mexico
CONCACAF Champions League winning clubs